Aleksandrs Beļavskis (born January 17, 1964) is a former Latvian/Soviet ice hockey player and captain of team Latvia, and current coach for the Latvia men's national ice hockey team. He played for two clubs for most of his player career Dinamo Riga where he started his professional career in 1985 and IF Björklöven. He was a prolific goal scorer and skilled playmaker.

Beļavskis has played for Latvia at the 2002 Winter Olympics.

Career statistics

Regular season and playoffs

International

References

External links
 
 
 
 

1964 births
Living people
Soviet emigrants to Latvia
Dinamo Riga players
Ice hockey players at the 2002 Winter Olympics
IF Björklöven players
Latvia men's national ice hockey team coaches
Latvian ice hockey coaches
Latvian ice hockey right wingers
Latvian expatriate sportspeople in Sweden
Expatriate ice hockey players in Sweden
Olympic ice hockey players of Latvia
Sportspeople from Vitebsk
Soviet ice hockey right wingers
Latvian expatriate ice hockey people